Charles Owen "Chuck" Prince III (born January 13, 1950) is an American corporate executive and lawyer. He is a former chairman and chief executive of Citigroup. He succeeded Sandy Weill as the chief executive of the firm in 2003, and as the chairman of the board in 2006. On November 4, 2007, he retired from both his chairman and chief executive duties due to unexpectedly poor 3rd quarter performance, mainly due to CDO and MBS related losses, while still receiving a $38m pay package.

Early life and education
Charles Owen Prince III was born in Lynwood, California on 13 January 1950 to Charles Owen Prince II and Mary Doyle. Prince went to the University of Southern California Marshall School of Business for his bachelor's degree, master's degree, and Juris Doctor. He continued his education, going on to receive a Master of Laws degree from Georgetown University Law Center.

Career
Prince started his career as an attorney with U.S. Steel Corp in 1975. In 1979, he joined Commercial Credit Company, a predecessor to Citigroup that Sandy Weill took over in 1986. He was promoted in 1996 to executive vice president of the firm, which at this point, was known as the Travelers Group. In 2000, shortly following the 1998 merger of Travelers and Citigroup, Prince was named chief administrative officer of the newly created firm, Citigroup. He was subsequently promoted to chief operating officer in 2001, to chairman and chief executive of Citi Markets and Banking in 2002, and finally to chairman and chief executive.

Credit crisis
On Sunday, 4 November 2007, Prince resigned from his post as CEO of Citigroup due to the failing mortgage industry. He was replaced by Vikram Pandit as the CEO of Citigroup, and by Robert Rubin as its chairman.

Prince left with an exit bonus valued at $12.5 million, in addition to the $68 million he received in stock and options he had accumulated during  his career, together with a $1.7 million pension, an office, car and driver for up to five years. During his tenure, the market value of Citigroup dropped by $64 billion. He is still a consultant with Citigroup.

In 2008, Fortune named Charles Prince as one of eight economic leaders "who didn't [see] the crisis coming", noting his overly optimistic statements in July 2007. In January 2009, Guardian city editor Julia Finch identified him as one of twenty-five people who were at the heart of the financial meltdown.

Prince famously said about Citigroup's continued commitment to leveraged buy-out deals, despite fears of reduced liquidity because of the occurring sub-prime meltdown: "As long as the music is playing, you’ve got to get up and dance."

Personal life
Prince is currently married to Margaret L. Wolff. The couple was wed on September 20, 2003, at The Pierre Hotel in New York City. Semi-retired Judge Robert W. Sweet presided over the ceremonies.

Affiliations
Prince serves in the influential trade group the Financial Services Forum, as well as a member of the Council of Foreign Relations, the Business Roundtable, and several other organizations. Along with his directorship on the Citigroup board, Prince has served as a member of Johnson & Johnson's board since February 13, 2006. He also serves as a trustee for several education institutions including Weill Medical College, Teachers College, and The Juilliard School. Prince formerly was a Senior Counselor to Albright Stonebridge Group.

See also
Robert Rubin
Gary Crittenden
 Subprime mortgage crisis

References

External links
Charles Owen Prince III at The New York Times
Charles Owen Prince III at Forbes

People from Lynwood, California
American chief executives of financial services companies
Citigroup employees
University of Southern California alumni
Georgetown University Law Center alumni
1950 births
Living people
American chief operating officers
USC Gould School of Law alumni